Caesar Herman "Cees" ten Cate (August 20, 1890, in Ngawi, Java – June 9, 1972, in Amsterdam) was a Dutch amateur football player who competed in the 1912 Summer Olympics.

International career
Ten Cate made his debut for the Netherlands in a June 1912 Olympic Games match against Sweden and earned all of his three caps at the tournament, winning a bronze medal. He was only included in the squad because first choice forwards Mannes Francken and Jan Thomee had to pull out.

References

External links

1890 births
1972 deaths
People from Ngawi Regency
Association football forwards
Dutch footballers
Footballers at the 1912 Summer Olympics
Olympic footballers of the Netherlands
Olympic bronze medalists for the Netherlands
Medalists at the 1912 Summer Olympics
Netherlands international footballers
Olympic medalists in football
HFC Haarlem players